Lake Smerdiacheje (Озеро Смердячье - lake which smells bad) is a small lake in Moscow Oblast of Russia near Shatura  north from the nearest village Bakhscheevo (Бакшеево).

Lake 
The lake is situated in a pine forest. It is round (diameter ) and appeared thousands years ago as a meteor crater. The condition of the lake is slowly degrading. The water changes colour, level and purity with seasons and years, and pine trees come very close to the shore of the lake. Smerdiachee is surrounded with a wall-like ring which is common for craters.

Transportation and tourism 
The lake can be accessed from Moscow by car (closest city is Roshal), but last miles must be done by foot through the forest (people usually park their cars in Bakhscheevo village). Several dozen tourists visit Smerdiacheje each year. The lake is also popular among strange people who are fond of UFO sightings and mystics. Locals from the village use the lake sometimes for fishing and pick wild berries nearby.

References 

Lakes of Moscow Oblast